Prairie is a rural town and locality in the Flinders Shire, Queensland, Australia. In the  the locality of Prairie had a population of 143 people.

Geography 
The town is located in the north of the locality. The Flinders Highway enters the locality from the north-east (Torrens Creek), passes through the town and exits to the north-west (Hughenden).

The Great Northern railway line runs parallel and immediately south of the highway, with the following railway stations (east to west):

 Warreah railway station, in the north-east of the locality
Karoon railway station, now abandoned
 Prairie railway station, serving the town
 Baronta railway station, now abandoned
Tolkuru railway station, now abandoned
Tindo railway station, in the north-west of the locality
Jardine Valley railway station, now abandoned

History 
The name Prairie comes from a pastoral station established by James Gilson who named it after the appearance of the local countryside.

Prairie State School opened in 1894.

In the  the locality of Prairie had a population of 143 people.

Education
Prairie State School is a government primary (Prep-6) school for boys and girls at Savage Street. In 2018, the school had an enrolment of 7 students with 1 teacher and 2 non-teaching staff (1 full-time equivalent).

There is no secondary school in Prairie. The nearest is Hughenden State School (to Year 12) in neighbouring Hughenden to the north-west.

Given the size of the locality, these schools will be too distant from those living in the south of the locality. Distance education or boarding schools would be options.

Amenities
The town is serviced by a hotel/motel (pub) and a cafe/post office.

References

External links

 

Towns in Queensland
Shire of Flinders (Queensland)
Localities in Queensland